Uzundzhovo Air Base (or Haskovo Malevo Airport) used to house a fighter air regiment and after its disbandment became a squadron of the 19th Fighter Air Regiment (HQ at Graf Ignatievo). When the 19th FAR was transformed into 3rd FAB and shifted to ADC Uzundzhovo went along as an independent unit: the 4th Fighter Air Base. Shortly afterwards it changed tasks and hats transferring to the Tactical Air Command as 21st Fighter-Bomber Air Base and finally disbanded.

21st Fighter-Bomber Air Base (Uzundzhovo)

Located in south east Bulgaria, near the city of Haskovo close to the border with Turkey. Postwar it was home to the 3rd Sqn of 19th FAR, then the 21st FAR, with the MiG-19 and MiG-21. In 1994 - 1996 it was home to the 4th Fighter Air Base of the Air Defence Corps. In 1996-1998 it was home to the 21st Fighter-Bomber Air Base of the Tactical Air Corps (exchanged for Graf Ignatievo). Closed in 1998 and demolished.
Runway data: Location: N41 58 34.95 E025 35 23.34, Elev: 160 ft (49 m), Rwy 11/29, Size: 7230 x 180 ft (2204 x 55 m), concrete.

References

See also
List of Bulgarian Air Force bases
Ravnets Air Base
Balchik Air Base
Bezmer Air Base
Cheshnegirovo Air Base
Dobroslavtsi Air Base
Dobrich Air Base
Gabrovnitsa Air Base
The Bulgarian Cosmonauts

Airports in Bulgaria